A Dialogue Concerning Oratorical Partitions (also called De Partitione Oratoria Dialogus, Partitiones Oratoriae, or De Partitionbus Oratoriae, translated to be "On the subdivisions of oratory") is a rhetorical treatise, written by Cicero. According to the method of the Middle Academy, the treatise is sometimes described as a "catechism of rhetoric," for it is presented in the form of questions and answers. Cicero wrote it as a handbook for his young son, Marcus, and structured the text as a dialogue between the two of them.

Historical reception of the text
Scholars debate exactly when the text was written, presumably in 54 BCE or in 46 BCE.

Around 54 BCE, Cicero was extremely interested in his son Marcus’ education, and he was not satisfied with the boy’s teacher. He expressed interest in teaching Marcus himself. At this time, Marcus was eleven years of age; the simple structure of the treatise of questions and answers would have been very appropriate for this age.   Furthermore, Cicero relates in his letters at this earlier point that he is very interested in Marcus’ education.

However, some scholars believe boys of this age were too young to be taught rhetoric. Thus, the treatise would have been written in 46 BCE, just before then 19-year-old Marcus left for Athens to study rhetoric. By this time in his life (from the year 56 onwards), Cicero could no longer voice his political principles without the risk of exile. “He had lost his freedom of speech and speech was his life.”  A Dialogue Concerning Oratorical Partitions would thus be one of Cicero’s treatises in this period of his life, written after his most famous dialogue on rhetoric, De oratore.

Summary of the text
The treatise begins when Cicero’s son asks his father, “I wish…to hear the rules concerning the principles of speaking…Into how many parts is the whole system of speaking divided?”

His father replies, “Is there anything, my Cicero, which I can be more desirous of than that you should be as learned as possible?”

Cicero then undertakes a systematic discussion of eloquence. He says rhetoric is arranged under three headings – “first of all, the power of the orator; secondly, the speech; thirdly, the subject of the speech.” The power of the orator consists of ideas and words, which must be “discovered and arranged.” “To discover” applies mostly to ideas and “to be eloquent” applies more to language. There are five “companions of eloquence” - “voice, gesture, expression of countenance,…action,…and memory.”. There are four parts of a speech: two of them explain a subject – “narration” and “confirmation;” two of them excite the minds of the hearers – “the opening” and “the peroration” (the conclusion). The narration and confirmation add credibility to the speech while the opening and conclusion should produce feelings.

He then goes on to say the “cause” or subject of a speech is “divided according to the divisions of hearers.” There are three kinds of subjects: embellishment, aimed to give pleasure; judicial, aimed to either make a judge punish or forgive; and deliberation, aimed to persuade the assembly to either hope or fear (see Aristotle on rhetorical genre). Of these causes, Cicero goes deepest into judicial oratory, therefore emphasizing “the desirableness of maintaining the laws, and the danger with which all public and private affairs are threatened."

Cicero ends his treatise with a humanistic view of rhetoric that praises expansive education.

“And without a knowledge of these most important arts how can an orator have either energy or variety in his discourse, so as to speak properly of things good or bad, just or unjust, useful or useless, honourable or base?”

Significance
The text may show the first sign of Cicero’s mature view of rhetoric, later expanded in De Oratore. In De Inventione, Cicero had outlined a technical idea of rhetoric based on the handbooks of his era. But as he aged, his view changed to an “all-encompassing” ideal modeled on Philo’s rhetorical teachings. Previous to and during Cicero’s lifetime, there was a quarrel between rhetoricians and philosophers over whether rhetoric was restricted to only the forensic and technical sphere, or if it included the abstract and philosophical realm. “Specifically, Cicero suggest[s] ascending from the [restrictive] to the [general] in a speech.”

This work thus merges rhetoric as a more simplistic, teachable art with the themes of De Oratore, praising the ideal orator who appreciates and utilizes expansive education and training.

References

External links
 
 A free, online edition of the text

Rhetoric works
Works by Cicero on oratory